Darwin Correa (born 23 August 1977) is an Uruguayan sprint canoer who competed in the mid-2000s. He won a bronze medal in the C-1 1000 m event at the 2003 Pan American Games in Santo Domingo.

Correa also competed in the C-1 500 m and the C-1 1000 m events at the 2004 Summer Olympics in Athens, but was eliminated in the semifinals of both events.

References
Sports-Reference.com profile

1977 births
Canoeists at the 2004 Summer Olympics
Living people
Olympic canoeists of Uruguay
Pan American Games bronze medalists for Uruguay
Uruguayan male canoeists
Pan American Games medalists in canoeing
Canoeists at the 2003 Pan American Games
Medalists at the 2003 Pan American Games